Rarities is a compilation album by Belgian recording artist Selah Sue.

Track listing

Charts

References

External links
Official website

2012 albums
Selah Sue albums